Smith/Kotzen is the name of a musical collaboration between musicians Adrian Smith of Iron Maiden and Richie Kotzen of The Winery Dogs.

Their self-titled debut album, released on March 26, 2021, was described by the Ultimate Classic Rock as a mix of "blues, hard rock, traditional R&B and more." Kotzen also added jazz fusion elements to some sections. Smith/Kotzen was supported by a first single released in January 2021, titled "Taking My Chances".

Both musicians share guitar, bass, vocal, composing and production duties on the album. Kotzen also plays drums on five tracks and Tal Bergman, Richie's longstanding friend and touring partner, replaces him on songs "You Don’t Know Me", "I Wanna Stay" and "'Til Tomorrow". The album also features special guest performance from Iron Maiden drummer Nicko McBrain on "Solar Fire".

Discography
Studio albums
 Smith/Kotzen (2021)

Extended Plays
 Better Days (2021)

References

2020 establishments in British Overseas Territories
2020 in American music
American blues rock musical groups
American hard rock musical groups
American heavy metal musical groups
American musical duos
Bertelsmann Music Group artists
Blues music supergroups
Cultural organisations based in the Turks and Caicos Islands
Music organizations based in the Caribbean
Musical groups established in 2020
Rock music supergroups
Turks and Caicos Islands music